Sweynsson is a Nordic surname. Notable people with the surname include:

 Harthacnut Sweynsson (born  880) 
 Cnut Sweynsson ( 985 or 995–1035)

Surnames of Scandinavian origin